Manfred Hoeberl (born 12 May 1964) is an Austrian former strongman and powerlifter who was known as having the largest arms in the world during the early-mid 1990s. Hoeberl was born in the same town as bodybuilding legend and former Governor of California, Arnold Schwarzenegger.

Life and career
Hoeberl won the Europe's Strongest Man twice (1993, 1994), the World Muscle Power Classic twice (1993, 1994) and was runner up at the 1994 World's Strongest Man competition, narrowly missing the title to Magnús Ver Magnússon by less than half a second in the final Atlas Stones event. Hoeberl competed in the World's Strongest Man finals in 1991 and 1993, finishing 8th and 4th respectively.

Hoeberl won Austria's Strongest Man 7 times, from 1989-1994 & 1996.

In the early 1990s Hoeberl claimed to have the largest arms in the world. At the 1994 Arnold Schwarzenegger Classic, bodybuilding journalist Joe Roark measured Hoeberl's upper arm to be  cold. Right after Hoeberl curled a 150 lb. dumbbell for several reps and was re-measured at 26 inches pumped. After the measurement Roark claimed Hoeberl was the first man in history to have an upper arm girth three times the size of his wrist circumference.

Shortly after this, Hoeberl co-wrote his first book 10 Minutes to Massive Arms.

Hoeberl was officially certified on the No. 3 Captains of Crush gripper in 1997.

Personal Records

Bench Press:  raw
Squat:  raw
Deadlift from height:  raw

Car crashes and retirement
Shortly after the 1994 World's Strongest Man contest, Hoeberl was involved in a near fatal car crash in which he broke several limbs, and fractured his hip in 8 places. After months of rehabilitation, Hoeberl returned to strongman competition, although he never again competed in the World's Strongest Man. A severe biceps injury sustained during the 1997 European Hercules contest forced him into retirement.

Hoeberl was involved in a second near fatal crash in 2002. Hoeberl was involved in a head-on collision with a truck while riding a motorcycle at 80 miles per hour. Due to his injuries Hoeberl is no longer weight training, he is quoted as saying "I am kinda lucky to be alive".

References

1964 births
Austrian strength athletes
Living people